Lightbulb lizards are found in the following genera:
 Andinosaura
 Oreosaurus
 Petracola
 Proctoporus
 Riama

 a species is also specifically called lightbulb lizard: Oreosaurus luctuosus

Gymnophthalmidae
Reptile common names